The Echota Cherokee Tribe of Alabama  is a state-recognized tribe in Alabama and Cherokee heritage group. It is based in northern Alabama and gained state-recognition under the Davis-Strong Act in 1984.

Recognition by an American state government is not the same as recognition on the federal level or recognition by continually existing Indian tribes.

Both the federally recognized Cherokee Nation and Eastern Band of Cherokee Indians oppose federal recognition of the Echota Cherokee Tribe of Alabama, listing them among "fraudulent groups."

Nonprofit organization 
The Echota Cherokee Tribe of Alabama has a 501(c)(3) nonprofit organization headquartered in Falkville, Alabama, and founded in 1995. Its missions is the "Education of general public with regard to Cherokee nation history, culture and background."

Heritage groups

Numerous organizations in the United States identify as having Cherokee heritage but lack documented ancestry or connection to the federally recognized Cherokee Nation, Eastern Band of Cherokee Indians, or United Keetoowah Band of Cherokee Indians in Oklahoma. Some of these groups have applied for federal recognition but been denied.

History 
After the passage of the Indian Removal Act in the 1830, the majority of the Cherokee people were forcibly removed from the Southeastern United States. The approximately 1,000 Cherokee people who remained in the Southeast formed the Eastern Band of Cherokee Indians and their tribe continues to live in the community known as the Qualla Boundary.

In 1980 a group of people ineligible to enroll in any federally recognized Native American tribe set up a nonprofit heritage club known as "The Echota Cherokee." In 1984, when the Alabama Indian Affairs Commission was established to represent Native American interests in the state, the group attained state recognition. The group is headquartered in Falkville, Alabama.

In 1997 the Echota Cherokee organization reported that they had 22,000 members. Only 21 members participated in the cited survey. They do not state what criteria they use for membership. Their stated accomplishments and goals at this time were that they had elected a council, and hoped to offer "instruction in the Cherokee language through the Alabama public school system."

The Echota Cherokee have a representative on the Alabama Indian Affairs Commission and the Inter-Tribal Council of Alabama's WIA Program, to assist workforce improvement.

Petition for federal recognition 
The Echota Cherokee Tribe of Alabama is not federally recognized as a Native American tribe, nor are they recognized by any of the federally recognized Cherokee communities.

The Echota Cherokee Tribe of Alabama sent a letter of intent to petition for federal recognition in 2009; however, the organization did not follow through with submitting a completed petition for federal recognition.

See also
Cherokee heritage groups
State-recognized tribes

References

External links 
 Self-description submitted to Alabama Indian Affairs site 
 "Echota Cherokee Pow Wow" photos in the Quad Cities Daily

1995 establishments in Alabama
Cherokee heritage groups
Cultural organizations based in Alabama
Non-profit organizations based in Alabama
Native American tribes in Alabama
State-recognized tribes in the United States
Washington County, Alabama